Alcide d'Orbigny (1802–1857) was a French naturalist and paleontologist who made contributions in zoology, geology, anthropology, and botany. 

d'Orbigny may also refer to:

Charles Henry Dessalines d'Orbigny (1806–1876), French botanist and geologist
Henri d'Orbigny (1845-1915), French architect and entomologist
D'Orbigny (meteorite)

See also
Orbigny (disambiguation)

Surnames of French origin